Intimate Games is a 1976 British comedy film directed by Tudor Gates and Martin Campbell and starring George Baker, Anna Bergman and Ian Hendry. It was shot at Twickenham Studios and on location in Oxford.

Cast

References

Bibliography 
 Babington, Bruce.  British Stars and Stardom: From Alma Taylor to Sean Connery. Manchester University Press, 2001.
 Pym, John. Time Out Film Guide. Time Out, 2004.

External links 
 

1976 films
1970s sex comedy films
British sex comedy films
1970s English-language films
Films directed by Martin Campbell
Films shot at Twickenham Film Studios
Films set in Oxford
1976 comedy films
1970s British films